The Province of Syracuse was a province in the autonomous island region of Sicily in Italy. Its capital was the city of Syracuse, a town established by Greek colonists arriving from Corinth in the 8th century BC. Syracuse had 8% of the Sicilian population and 8.2% of Sicily's area.

Following the suppression of the Sicilian provinces, it was replaced in August 2015 by the Free municipal consortium of Syracuse.

Geography and heritage

The Province of Syracuse lies in the southeastern Sicily, in southwestern Italy. It is bordered to the north and north-west by the Province of Catania to the west by the Province of Ragusa, and to the east and south by the Ionian and Mediterranean seas.
In 2002, ancient centres of Noto, Palazzolo Acreide and six other towns in the Noto Valley, were awarded UNESCO World Heritage Site status, and is a significant attraction due to its historical, architectural, artistic and archaeological interest. The towns are particularly dense with late Baroque architecture, dates to the immense rebuilding of the towns which took place after the 1693 earthquake which devastated Sicily. The capital of Syracuse is an important road and rail hub of Sicily.  The Park of Neapolis on the island of Ortygia is connected by three bridges to the mainland. The island contains the Maniace Castle, dated to the Hohenstaufen period and the Doric Temple of Athena, which was renovated by the Normans.

The Hyblaean Mountains are the dominant mountain range in the province, sloping down to a coastline  which contains stretches of white sandy beaches, cliffs, bays, and islets. The coast to the south of Syracuse contains numerous protected areas, such as the Area Marina Protetta del Plemmirio, the Riserva Naturale Orientara Cavagrande between Cassibile and Avola, and the Riserva Naturale Orientata faunistica di Vendicar, north of Pachino. Within the province lies Lago di Lentini, the largest lake in Sicily, and reputedly the largest artificial lake in Europe, which supports a marshland habitat with over 150 different species.

Towns 

There are 21 comuni (or municipalities) in the province. The most populated as of 2005 were:

References

External links 

  Official Province website
 Pictures, history, tourism, gastronomy, books, local products, local surnames, transportation in the province of Syracuse

 
Syracuse
Wine regions of Italy